Peter Coyle (born 24 September 1963, in Limerick) is an Irish former footballer.

Club career 
He began his career with Limerick schoolboys club Vereker Clements, and won five schoolboys international caps for Ireland in 1979.  

Coyle made his League of Ireland debut for Limerick United against Home Farm on 2 January 1983. He spent eight seasons with Limerick. During this tenure at Limerick he won the PFAI Young Player of the Year award in 1984–85.

He played with Limerick City for eight seasons before leaving the club to sign for Pat Byrne at Shelbourne in January 1991. He was with Shelbourne for two seasons but left at the end of 1992–93 to take up work opportunities before returning in January 1994.

International career 
Coyle was capped three times by Ireland at under-21 level, making his debut in the Toulon Tournament in a 1–1 draw with France on 5 June 1983. He also captained the Irish Universities representative football team.

Honours
Shelbourne
 FAI Cup: 1993

Limerick
 PFAI Young Player of the Year: 1984–85

References

1963 births
Living people
League of Ireland players
Shelbourne F.C. players
Limerick F.C. players
Association football defenders
Republic of Ireland youth international footballers
Republic of Ireland under-21 international footballers
Republic of Ireland association footballers
Association footballers from County Limerick